Mary Ann Burnett (died 18 December 1856) was a British botanist, author and editor.

Life and work

Burnett was the illustrator and editor of Illustrations of Useful Plants employed in the Arts and Medicine (1839–40). Some of the text was written by her brother Gilbert Thomas Burnett. Subsequent editions from 1840 onwards name Mary Ann as the author. Burnett dedicated the 1842 edition of the book to her patron, Miss Minshull.

Burnett died at Fitzroy Square, London, in December 1856 "after a long and painful illness".

Burnett gallery

Selected publications 

 Burnett, M. A. (1842). Plantae utiliores: or illustrations of useful plants, employed in the arts and medicine (Vol. 1). Whittaker & Company.

External links

References 

19th-century British botanists
1856 deaths
Place of birth missing
British women botanists